is a 1998 Japanese film directed by Takashi Miike. The film features the Japanese musical groups Speed and Da Pump.

Plot
High school students Mainosuke "Mai" Hitomi and Yuu kiss for the first time. Later that same day Mai is hit by a truck and killed. Her scientist father, Toshihiko Hitomi, uses a scan of her memories created before her death to construct an AI copy of her, named "Ai". Soccer, the CEO of the American tech company Digital Ware, wishes to awaken his own AI and sends an agent to shoot Toshihiko and steal his software, but Toshihiko sends Ai through the modem to safety before dying. Ai finds Yuu through a school computer terminal nicknamed "Icon" that has been enhanced by Satoshi Takanaka, Mai's genius half-brother with a terminal brain disease. Yuu transfers Ai to his laptop, through which she interacts with him and Mai's old friends, including Rika, who is jealous of Yuu's love for Ai. Soccer sends Satoshi and others to chase down Yuu and capture Ai.

Cast
Hiroko Shimabukuro as Mai Hitomi & Ai
Eriko Imai as Yôko
Takako Uehara as Rika
Hitoe Arakaki as Nao
Kenji Harada as Yuu
Ryô Karato as Satoshi Takanaka
Christopher Doyle as Sakkaa/Soccer
Tomorowo Taguchi as Gôda
Issa Hentona as Tooru
Shinobu Miyara as Hiroyuki
Yukinari Tamaki as Kazuma
Ken Okumoto as Daiki
Anna Ide as Mai as a child
Akihiro Yoshikawa as Yuu as a child
Kazuki Kitamura as Sada
Michelle Gazepis as Sakkaa's/Soccer's secretary
Hiromi Suzuki as Mai's mother
Naoto Takenaka as Kurosawa
Tsunehiko Watase as Toshihiko Hitomi/Mai's father/Ai's creator

Release
Andromedia was distributed theatrically in Japan by Shochiku on July 11, 1998. The film was released on DVD and VHS in Japan by Toy's Factory and in the United States by Pathfinder Pictures.

Reception
Tom Mes, author of Agitator: The Cinema of Takashi Miike, described Andromedia as the "most unabashedly commercial film" Miike had made at this point in his career.

Notes

References

External links

 

1990s science fiction action films
Films directed by Takashi Miike
Films about artificial intelligence
Films about consciousness transfer
Films set in Detroit
Films set in Kamakura
Films set in Toronto
1990s Japanese-language films
Japanese high school films
Japanese science fiction action films
1990s English-language films
1990s Japanese films